Catocala amnonfreidbergi is a moth of the family Erebidae. It is endemic to the Levant.

The wingspan is about 73 mm. Adults are on wing in July. There is probably one generation per year.

References

amnonfreidbergi
Moths described in 2008
Moths of the Middle East